Shaheed Nawab Mir Ghous Bakhsh Khan Raisani (6 September 1924  26 May 1987), was a Pakistani politician who served second governor of Balochistan from 26 December 1971 to 29 April 1972. He was also a federal minister for Food and Agriculture and the provincial president of the Pakistan Peoples Party. 
RAISANI, Nawab Ghaus Bakhsh Raisani was born on September 6, 1924, in Kanak, Baluchistan. Son of late Nawab Sir Asadullah Khan Raisani. He studied in the famous Col.Brown Cambridge School, Dehra Dun where only Nawabs and Prince were allowed to study before independence and the School is well known for its discipline throughout India.

He was the father of

Nawabzada Aminullah Khan Raisani,

Nawabzada Asadullah Khan Raisani

Nawab Mir Muhammad Aslam Khan Raisani,

Nawabzada Mir Abdul Nabi Khan Raisani,

Nawabzada Haji Mir Lashkari Khan Raisani ,

Shaheed Nawabzada Mir Ismail Khan Raisani,

Shaheed Nawabzada Mir Siraj Khan Raisani ,

Nawabzada Umar Khan Raisani

Nawabzada Nauroze Khan Raisani

Death 
He was killed in 1987 along with his four bodyguards in Mehrgarh area of Kachhi District.

References

1986 deaths
Brahui people
Governors of Balochistan, Pakistan
Leaders of the Opposition in the Provincial Assembly of Balochistan
Pakistan People's Party politicians
Year of birth missing